Annette Hasbrook is a former NASA flight director, and is currently NASA's assistant manager for integration on the Orion Program.

Biography

Education
Hasbrook received her Bachelor of Science in Mechanical Engineering from the University of Notre Dame in Notre Dame, Indiana.

Career
She was a flight director at the NASA Johnson Space Center in Houston, Texas, from 2000 to 2009. Hasbrook worked with the Space Shuttle Discovery, and the Space Shuttle Endeavour. She was also NASA's lead flight director for Expedition 10.

Hasbrook is now assistant manager of NASA's Orion Program.

See also

Holly Ridings
Orion program
NASA
Johnson Space Center
List of University of Notre Dame alumni

References

20th-century births
NASA people
University of Notre Dame alumni
American women engineers
American engineers
Living people
Year of birth missing (living people)
21st-century American women